"Electric Eye" is the second song on English heavy metal band Judas Priest’s 1982 album Screaming for Vengeance. It has become a staple at concerts, usually played as the first song. AllMusic critic Steve Huey called the song a classic.

Benediction and Helloween, amongst many other bands, have covered this song.

Background 
Musically, the song is in the key of E minor, and its guitar solo is played by Glenn Tipton.

"Electric Eye" is an allusion to the book Nineteen Eighty-Four by George Orwell, in the use of the name of the pseudo-omniscient camera that watches over the community at all times. In this dystopia, the form of government, Ingsoc (Newspeak for English Socialism), is utterly totalitarian, and if citizens are caught rebelling in any manner, they "disappear". In the song by Judas Priest, however, the cameras are updated to take the form of a powerful satellite, that is "elected," to take "pictures that can prove," and "keep the country clean". Thus, the song has been called "prescient" for its depiction of a modern surveillance state, operating within the context of an ostensibly democratic nation.

Covers and other uses 
Helloween recorded a version of this song for the Tribute to Judas Priest: Legends of Metal. It also appears in the single The Time Of The Oath, and in the expanded edition of the album The Time Of The Oath.

"Electric Eye" is featured in the 2006 video game Grand Theft Auto: Vice City Stories on the fictional in-game radio station "V-Rock". It is also a playable track in Guitar Hero Encore: Rocks the 80s as a master track, including "The Hellion", and it also appears on Guitar Hero Smash Hits. Additionally, it is available for download on Rock Band, as of 22 April 2009, as part of the entire Screaming for Vengeance album download, or as a single song. It was also featured in the second trailer for the video game Brütal Legend.

This song is referenced in the movie Tenacious D in The Pick of Destiny, in the song "Break in-City (Storm the Gate!)".

The song was played live at the 2011 Revolver Magazine Golden God Awards show by Duff McKagan's Loaded, with vocals by Slipknot and Stone Sour's Corey Taylor and guitar by Sex Pistols' Steve Jones.

The song was referenced in the South Park episode Fat Butt and Pancake Head; when the boys visit the mall to spend Cartman's $20 gift certificate, they can be seen arguing in front of a store called "The Electric Eye".

"Electric Eye" was covered by the metalcore band As I Lay Dying from the compilation Decas, and was released as a single. The band made a music video for the song and was first available to stream via Noisecreep on 3 October 2011.

The song was also covered in 2014 by Lissie and released on an EP album "Cryin' to You" and performs the songs on tour.

Professional wrestler Aja Kong uses the song with "The Hellion" as her entrance music.

Personnel
Rob Halford – vocals
Glenn Tipton – lead guitar
K. K. Downing – rhythm guitar
Ian Hill – bass
Dave Holland – drums

Charts

See also
Mass surveillance
New World Order (conspiracy theory)

References

Judas Priest songs
1982 singles
Songs written by Rob Halford
Songs written by Glenn Tipton
Songs written by K. K. Downing
1982 songs
Columbia Records singles
Mass surveillance in fiction
Works about totalitarianism
Music based on Nineteen Eighty-Four